Many of the former and active Squadrons of the French Air and Space Force have direct lineage links to many of the "dissolved" squadrons. In addition, each Squadron has for military awards and decorations, and a Fanion (squadron standard).

The Air Force has undergone many echelon (ranking) changes at the level of Escadre (Wing), Escadron/Squadrons and Escadrille. The traditions and accomplishments of many Escadre, Escadron and the Lafayette Escadrille and other units can be traced back to World War I.

Squadrons include the following:

Active Squadrons

Strategic Air Forces Command (CFAS) 

 Escadron de Chasse 1/4 Gascogne
 Escadron de Chasse 2/4 La Fayette
 Escadron de Ravitaillement en Vol 4/31 Sologne Air Refueling Squadron
 Escadron de Ravitaillement en Vol et de Transport Stratégiques 1/31 Bretagne Strategic Air-to-Air Refuelling and Transport Squadron
 Escadron de Soutien Technique Spécialisé 15/93 Specialised Technical Support Squadron
 Escadron de Soutien Technique Aéronautique 15/31 Camargue Aeronautical Technical Support Squadron
 Escadron d'armement Spécialisé 66/31 Méditerranéé Specialised Arms Squadron

Air Forces Command (CFA)

Fighter Brigade 

Fighter Squadrons

 Escadron de Chasse 1/2 Cigognes at BA 116
 Escadron de Chasse 1/3 Navarre at BA 133
 Escadron de Chasse 2/3 Champagne at BA 133
 Escadron de Chasse 3/3 Ardennes at BA 133
 Escadron de Chasse 2/5 Île-de-France at BA 115
 Escadron de Chasse 3/11 Corse at BA 188
 Escadron de Chasse 2/30 Normandie-Niemen at BA 118
 Escadron de Chasse 3/30 Lorraine at BA 118
 Escadron de Chasse 1/7 Provence at BA 104

Other Squadrons

 Escadron de Transformation Mirage 2000D 4/3 Argonne at BA 133
 Escadron de Transformation Rafale 3/4 Aquitaine (joint Air Force / Navy unit) at BA 113
 Escadron de chasse et d'expérimentation 1/30 Côte d'Argent at BA 118
 Escadron de Drones 1/33 Belfort at BA 709

Special Air Forces Brigade (BFSA) 

 Escadron de Transport 3/61 Poitou at BA 123
 Escadron d'Hélicoptères 1/67 Pyrénées at BA 120

Projection and Support Air Force Brigade (BAAP) 
 Transport Squadrons
 Escadron de Transport 41 Verdun at BA 107
 Escadron de Transport 43 Médoc at BA 106
 Escadron de Transport 50 Réunion at DA 181 (overseas transport squadron) 
 Escadron de Transport 52 Tontouta at BA 186 (overseas transport squadron)
 Escadron de Transport 55 Ouessant at EA 470
 Escadron de Transport 60 at BA 107
 Escadron de Transport 3/60 Estérel at BA 110 (the VIP transport fleet)
 Escadron de Transport 1/61 Touraine at BA 123
 Escadron de Transport 2/61 Franche-Comté at BA 123
 Escadron de Transport 1/62 Vercors at BA 105
 Escadron de Transport 3/62 Ventoux at BA 105
 Escadron de Transport 2/64 Anjou at BA 105
 Escadron de Transport 68 Antilles-Guyane at BA 367 (overseas transport squadron) 
 Escadron de Transport 82 Maine at DA 190 (overseas transport squadron)
 Escadron de Transport 88 Larzac at BA 188 (overseas transport squadron)

Helicopters

 Escadron d'Hélicoptères 1/44 Solenzara at BA 126
 Escadron d'Hélicoptères 3/67 Parisis at BA 107
 Escadron d'Hélicoptères 5/67 Alpilles at BA 115

Operational Transition School (ETO)

 Escadron de Transition Opérationnelle 1/8 Saintonge at BA 120
 Escadron de Transition Opérationnelle 2/8 Nice at BA 120  (joint Franco-Belgian unit)
 Escadron d'Entraînement 3/8 Côte d'Or at BA 120

Other Squadrons

 Mixed Air Group 56 Vaucluse (operational control exerted by Directorate-General for External Security (DGSE))
 Escadrille Aérosanitaire 6/560 Etampes
 Escadron électronique aéroporté 1/54 Dunkerque at BA 105 (electronic intelligence gathering squadron) 
 Centre d'Instruction des Equipages d'Hélicoptères 341 Colonel Alexis Santini at BA 115
 Centre d'Instruction des Equipages de Transport 340 Général Lionel de Marmier at BA 123
 Escadron de Ravitaillement en Vol et de Transport 1/31 Bretagne at BA 125
 Escadron de Ravitaillement en Vol 4/31 Sologne at BA 125
 Escadron de Formation des Navigateurs de Combat 1/93 at BA 701
 Escadron D'Instruction en Vol 3/5 Comtat Venaissin at BA 701
 Escadron D'Instruction en Vol 2/93 Cévennes at BA 701
 Escadron D'Instruction au vol à Voile Sainte Victoire at BA 701
 Équipe de Voltige de l’Armée de l’Air at BA 701
 Centre de Formation à l'Aéronautique Militaire Initiale 5/312 Capitaine Élisabeth Boselli at BA 701
 Escadron de détection et de contrôle aéroportés 36 Berry at BA 702
 École de L'Aviation de Transport 319 Capitaine Jean Dartiques at BA 702
 Escadron D'Instruction en Vol Fourchambault at BA 702
 École de L'Aviation de Chasse 314 Christian Martell at BA 705
 Escadron D'Instruction en Vol 3/4 Limousin at BA 705
 Escadron D'Instruction en Vol 3/13 Auvergne at BA 705
 École de Pilotage de l’Armée de l’Air 315 Général Jarry at BA 709
 Escadron D'Instruction en Vol 1/13 Artois at BA 709
 Escadron D'Instruction en Vol 2/12 Picardie at BA 709

Airspace Control Air Force Brigade  (BACE) 

 Escadron de détection et de contrôle aéroportés 36 Berry
The following surface-to-air missile squadrons (EDSA) have been attached to BACE since September 1, 2007:

Air Force Security and Intervention Forces Brigade (BAFSI) 
  (Air Force Parachute Commando No. 10, part of Special Operations Command) 
   (Air Force Parachute Commando No. 20)(C.P.A. 20) 
  (Air Force Parachute Commando No. 30) (C.P.A 30)

Inactive Squadrons

Escadrons de Bombardement 
(bombardment squadron)

 Escadron de Bombardement 1/91 Gascogne 
Escadron de Bombardement 2/91 Bretagne 
 
  (ex 2/93, renuméroté avec l'individualisation d'une escadre de ravitaillement en vol)
 )
 Escadron de Bombardement 2/92 Aquitaine 
 
 )

Escadrons de Chasse (EC) 
(Fighter Squadron)

  & Escadron de Chasse 1/1 Corse 
 
  & Escadron de Chasse 3/1 Argonne 
 
 
 )
  flew the Mirage 2000N from Luxeuil. 
 
 
 
 
 Escadron de Chasse 2/6 Normandie-Niemen 
 
 
 
 
  previously used Mirage 2000N's at BA 125 Istres as EC 3/4. 
 
 
 
 
 
 
  
 
 
 
 
 
 
 
 
 
 
 Escadron de chasse 1/30 Normandie-Niemen 
 
 
 Escadron de Chasse 3/33 Lorraine  
 
 Escadron de Chasse et d'Experimentation 5/33 Côte d'Argent flying Dassault Rafale B from BA 188 Mont-de-Marsan in 2013.

Escadrons d’Hélicoptères  
(Helicopter squadron)

Escadrons de Ravitaillement en Vol 
(Air Supply Squadron)

  with C-135F at BA 188 Mont-de-Marsan from October 1964.
 )

Escadrons de Reconnaissance 
(Reconnaissance squadron)

   redesignated  on September 1, 2010.
  operated Mirage F1CT's, Mirage F1CR's and Mirage F1B's from BA 188 Mont-de-Marsan 
 
 
 )

Escadrons de Transport 
(Transport Squadron)

  )
 
 
  
 
  
  
  
 
  
  
 
 ETOM 82 Tahiti with CN235M-200

Escadrons électroniques 
(Electronic Squadron)

Escadron d'Entraînement 
(Training Squadron)

 Escadron d'Entraînement 2/2 Côte d'Or became EE 3/8 Côte d'Or.

Escadrons de défense sol-air 
(Ground-to-Air Defense Squadron)

 , disbanded 3 July 2009

Abbreviations 

CIEH Centre d'instruction des équipages d'hélicoptères (helicopter crew training center)
CIET Centre d'instruction des équipages de Transport (airlift/transport crew training center)
 CIT Centre d'instruction tactique (tactical instruction center)
 EAC Ecole de l'aviation de chasse (fighter aviation school)
 EAT Ecole de l'aviation de transport (transport aviation school)
 EC Escadron de chasse (fighter wing)
 ECN Escadrille de chasse de nuit (night fighter squadron)
 EDCA Escadron de détection et de contrôle aéroporté (detection and aircraft control wing)
 EE Escadron d'Entrainement (training squadron)
 EPEAA Ecole de pilotage élémentaire de l'armée de l'air (air force basic flight school)
 ER Escadron de reconnaissance (reconnaissance wing)
 ERS Escadron de reconnaissance stratégique (strategic reconnaissance wing)
 ERV Escadron de ravitaillement en vol (flight refueling wing)
 ET Escadron de transport (transport wing)
 ETE Escadron de transport et entraînement (transport and training wing)
 ETM Escadron de transport mixte (mixed transport wing)
 EIV Escadron d’instruction en vol (flight instruction wing)
 ETO Escadron de transition opérationnelle (operational transition wing)
 GAO Groupe Aériens d'Observation (airborne observation group—army co-operation squadrons)
 GC Groupe de chasse (fighter group)
 GE Groupement école (school group)
 GR Groupe de reconnaissance (reconnaissance group)

References

Bibliography

French Air Force aircraft squadrons, list of